Tapawa-Wawa (also Tappawa-Wawa) is a village in the commune of Banyo in the Adamawa Region of Cameroon. et le département du Mayo-Banyo au Cameroun.

Population 
In 1967, Tapawa-Wawa contained 291 inhabitants, mostly Wawa.
At the time of the 2005 census, there were 726 people in the village.

References

Bibliography 
 Jean Boutrais, 1993, Peuples et cultures de l'Adamaoua (Cameroun) : actes du colloque de Ngaoundéré du 14 au 16 janvier 1992, Paris : Éd. de l'ORSTOM u.a.
 Dictionnaire des villages de l'Adamaoua, ONAREST, Yaoundé, October 1974, 133 p.

External links 

 Banyo, on the website Communes et villes unies du Cameroun (CVUC)

Populated places in Adamawa Region